{{DISPLAYTITLE:C21H26O3}}
The molecular formula C21H26O3 (molar mass: 326.42 g/mol, exact mass: 326.1882 u) may refer to:

 Acitretin
 Buparvaquone
 Moxestrol
 Octabenzone
 RU-16117
 11-Hydroxycannabinol

Molecular formulas